Gilsey House is a former eight-story 300-room hotel located at 1200 Broadway at West 29th Street in the NoMad neighborhood of Manhattan, New York City.  It is a New York City landmark and on the National Register of Historic Places.

History 

Gilsey House was designed by Stephen Decatur Hatch for Peter Gilsey, a Danish immigrant merchant and city alderman who leased the plot – which included the grounds of the St. George Cricket Club – from Caspar Samlar for $10,000 a year. It was constructed from 1869 to 1871 at the cost of $350,000, opening as the Gilsey House Hotel in 1872.  The cast-iron for the facade of the Second Empire style building was fabricated by Daniel D. Badger, a significant and influential advocate for cast-iron architecture at the time; the extent to which Badger contributed to the design of the facade is unknown.

The hotel was luxurious – the rooms featured rosewood and walnut finishing, marble fireplace mantles, bronze chandeliers and tapestries  – and offered services to its guests such as telephones, the first hotel in New York to do so. It was a favorite of Diamond Jim Brady, Aimee Crocker and Oscar Wilde, Samuel Clemens was a guest, and it attracted the theatrical trade at a time when the area – which became known as the "Tenderloin" – was becoming the primary entertainment and amusement district for New York's growing population, with numerous theatres, gambling clubs and brothels.

Gilsey House closed in 1911 after legal conflict beginning in 1904 between the operator of the hotel, Seaboard Hotel Company, and the Gilsey estate over the terms of the lease. Parts of the facade, such as cast-iron columns, which went over the property line were removed, and the building deteriorated, with rust, water damage and sagging floors. In 1925, plans were filed to rebuild the structure as an ordinary loft building of brick and stone, but were never carried out, although the ground-level storefronts were modernized in 1946. The building's future was decided when it was purchased in 1980 by Richard Berry and F. Anthony Zunino and converted into co-operative apartments after a cosmetic cleanup of the exterior, which won a commendation from the Friends of Cast Iron Architecture. The facade was finally almost fully restored in 1992 by Building Conservation Associates.

The building, with its "extraordinary" three-story mansard roof  and its "vigor that only the waning years of the 19th century could muster" was added to the National Register of Historic Places in 1978.  It was designated a New York City landmark in 1979.

See also
 National Register of Historic Places listings in Manhattan from 14th to 59th Streets
 List of New York City Designated Landmarks in Manhattan from 14th to 59th Streets

References
Notes

External links 

1871 establishments in New York (state)
Broadway (Manhattan)
Cast-iron architecture in New York City
Hotel buildings completed in 1871
Hotel buildings on the National Register of Historic Places in Manhattan
Hotels in Manhattan
New York City Designated Landmarks in Manhattan
Residential condominiums in New York City
Second Empire architecture in New York City